USS Roi (CVE-103) was a  of the United States Navy. She was named after the Battle of Roi, in which the United States captured the island of Roi-Namur. Built for service during World War II, the ship was launched in June 1944, commissioned in July, and acted as a transport and as a replenishment carrier. During the latter months of the war, she provided aircraft and supplies to the Fast Carrier Task Force, continuing until the end of the war. Postwar, she participated in Operation Magic Carpet. She was decommissioned in May 1946, and she was sold for scrapping in December.

Design and description

Roi was a Casablanca-class escort carrier, the most numerous type of aircraft carrier ever built, and designed specifically to be mass-produced using prefabricated sections, in order to replace heavy early war losses in the early engagements of the Pacific War. She displaced  standard,  with a full load. She was powered with two Skinner Unaflow reciprocating steam engines, which drove two shafts, providing , thus enabling her to make . Her compact size necessitated the installment of an aircraft catapult at her bow, and there were two aircraft elevators to facilitate movement of aircraft between the flight and hangar deck: one each fore and aft.

One /38 caliber dual-purpose gun was mounted on the stern. Anti-aircraft defense was provided by 8 Bofors  anti-aircraft guns in single mounts, as well as 12 Oerlikon  cannons, which were mounted around the perimeter of the deck. By the end of the war, Casablanca-class carriers had been modified to carry thirty 20-mm cannons, and the amount of 40-mm guns had been doubled to sixteen, by putting them into twin mounts. These modifications were in response to increasing casualties due to kamikaze attacks. Casablanca-class escort carriers were designed to carry 27 aircraft, but the hangar deck could accommodate more. Because Roi was never utilized in a combat operation, she usually operated with about 60 aircraft on board, the maximum carrying capacity at which take-offs would still be possible.

Construction
Her construction was awarded to Kaiser Shipbuilding Company, Vancouver, Washington under a Maritime Commission contract, on 18 June 1942, under the name Alava Bay, as part of a tradition which named escort carriers after bays or sounds in Alaska. She was renamed Roi, after the capture of the island Roi-Namur during the Battle of Kwajalein, as part of a new naval policy which named subsequent Casablanca-class carriers after naval or land engagements. The escort carrier was laid down on 3 March 1944, MC hull 1140, the forty-ninth of a series of fifty Casablanca-class escort carriers. She therefore received the classification symbol CVE-103. She was launched on 2 June 1944; sponsored by Mrs. William Sinton; transferred to the United States Navy and commissioned on 6 July 1944, with Captain Percy Haverly Lyon in command.

Service history

World War II

Upon being commissioned, Roi underwent a shakedown cruise down the West Coast to San Diego. She then underwent several transport missions, first departing from San Diego on 13 August, carrying a load of 287 passengers and 71 aircraft bound for Manus Island and Espiritu Santo. She returned to port on 27 September, and conducted another transport run to Manus on 21 October. On 2 December, she made another transport run, making stops at Guam and Eniwetok. After completing her mission, she arrived at Alameda, California for overhaul. After overhaul was completed, she made two more round-trip transport missions to bases in the Marshalls and Mariana Islands. She then headed for Pearl Harbor, where she underwent training operations. There, she was also assigned to become a replenishment carrier supporting the frontline Fast Carrier Task Force, providing replacement aircraft, supplies, and fuel for the fleet carriers. The replenishment carrier fleet enabled the fast carriers to operate at sea for a sustained period of time without having to return to port to replenish.

After loading 61 replenishment aircraft, she sailed for Guam, where she joined Task Force 30.8, the replenishment escort carrier task group. She rendezvoused with the Fast Carrier Task Force (Task Group 38) on designated days, in order to replace losses sustained in operations against mainland Japan. She rendezvoused with the fast carriers on 12 July, 16 July, and 20 July. After exhausting her replacement aircraft, she stopped at Guam on 21 July to replenish. She departed on 27 July, with a full load of 61 aircraft, and conducted rendezvous again with the fast carriers on 14 August. Shortly afterwards, while she was at sea, the Japanese surrender was announced. She then joined the main contingent of the Third Fleet, in support of the Occupation of Japan.

Following the end of the war, Roi joined the Operation Magic Carpet fleet, which repatriated U.S. servicemen from around the Pacific. She conducted several Magic Carpet runs throughout 1945 until she was released from the fleet. She then reported to Bremerton, Washington, where she was deactivated and decommissioned on 9 May 1946. She was struck from the Navy list on 21 May, and sold on 31 December to Zidell Machinery & Supply of Portland, Oregon for scrapping. Roi was awarded one battle star for her World War II service.

References

Sources

Online sources

Bibliography

External links 

 

 

Casablanca-class escort carriers
World War II escort aircraft carriers of the United States
Ships built in Vancouver, Washington
1944 ships
S4-S2-BB3 ships